Union Village could refer to:
 Union Village, Grenada
 Union Village, Rhode Island
 Union Village, Vermont
 Union Village Shaker settlement
 the former name for Greenwich (village), New York